Dora Nelson is a 1935 French comedy film directed by René Guissart and starring Elvira Popescu, André Lefaur and Frédéric Duvallès. The film was based on a play by Louis Verneuil. In 1939 it was remade as an Italian film of the same title.

Synopsis
A leading film star abandons the picture she is working on, and elopes with her lover to Italy. The desperate filmmakers recruit a poor woman who strongly resembles her to take her place.

Partial cast
 Elvira Popescu as Dora Nelson et Suzanne Verdier  
 André Lefaur as Philippe de Moreuil  
 Frédéric Duvallès as Étienne Beaupertuis  
 Micheline Cheirel as Yvonne de Moreuil  
 Julien Carette as Fouchard  
 Paule Andral as Madame de Chantalard  
 Annie Carriel as Madame d'Aubigny 
 Jenny Burnay as Elsa  
 Andrée Champeaux as Célestine  
 Clara d'Arc as Huguette

References

Bibliography 
 Gundle, Stephen. Mussolini's Dream Factory: Film Stardom in Fascist Italy. Berghahn Books, 2013.

External links 
 

1935 films
French comedy films
French black-and-white films
1935 comedy films
1930s French-language films
Films directed by René Guissart
Films set in Italy
Films set in France
French films based on plays
Films based on works by Louis Verneuil
1930s French films